Tyler Forbes (born 18 April 2002) is a British Virgin Islands footballer, currently playing for  Weymouth F.C.

Club career
In 2020, Forbes made the step up to Heybridge Swifts' first team from their youth set-up. Later that year, Forbes joined Poole Town.

International career
Forbes made his senior international debut on 16 October 2018, coming on for Leo Forte in the 60th minute of a 4–0 defeat to Martinique during CONCACAF Nations League qualifying. He scored his first senior international goal on 6 September 2019, in the 32nd minute of a 4–2 defeat to Bonaire during CONCACAF Nations League play.

Career statistics

International

International goals
Scores and results list the British Virgin Islands' goal tally first.

References

Living people
2002 births
British Virgin Islands footballers
British Virgin Islands international footballers
Association football forwards
Heybridge Swifts F.C. players
Poole Town F.C. players
People from Road Town